Derek Hadley (born 6 June 1954) is an English former professional rugby league footballer who played in the 1970s, 1980s and 1990s, and referee.

Background
Derek Hadley was born in Barrow-in-Furness, Lancashire, England.

Playing career
Derek Hadley signed for Barrow on 13 August 1973. the same day as Eddie Szymala, and he made his début for Barrow against New Hunslet at Craven Park, Barrow-in-Furness on Friday 7 September 1973, and he played his last match (in his first spell) for Barrow against the Sheffield Eagles at Craven Park, Barrow-in-Furness on Wednesday 30 April 1986, and he made his second début for Barrow against Mansfield Marksman at Craven Park, Barrow-in-Furness on Sunday 4 September 1988, and he played his last match (in his second spell) for Barrow against Bramley at Craven Park, Barrow-in-Furness on Sunday 15 January 1995.

County Cup Final appearances
Through injury, Derek Hadley missed Barrow's 12-8 victory over Widnes in the 1983 Lancashire County Cup Final during the 1983–84 season at Central Park, Wigan, on Saturday 1 October 1983.

John Player Trophy Final appearances
Derek Hadley played  in Barrow's 5-12 defeat by Warrington in the 1980–81 John Player Trophy Final during the 1980–81 at Central Park, Wigan, on Saturday 24 January 1981.

Testimonial match
Derek Hadley, and Eddie Szymala shared a Testimonial match/Benefit season at Barrow during the 1983–84 Rugby Football League season, Derek Hadley was awarded a second Testimonial match/Benefit season at Barrow during the 1993–94 Rugby Football League season.

Outside of rugby league
Derek Hadley has worked at GlaxoSmithKline, North Lonsdale Road, Ulverston, Cumbria, LA12 9DR.

References

External links

1954 births
Living people
Barrow Raiders players
Cumbria rugby league team players
English rugby league players
English rugby league referees
Rugby league players from Barrow-in-Furness
Rugby league utility players